Ryan Turner is a retired American soccer midfielder who played professionally in the USL A-League.

Turner played for the Santos Soccer Club in Arizona which went to the finals of the McGuire Cup (U-19 U.S. Youth National Championship).
Turner attended the University of Notre Dame.  He played three years for the Fighting Irish, scoring twenty-one goals in sixty-two games.  He was a 1998 Academic All American and graduated with a Bachelor of Business Administration in Finance.  In February 1999, the Kansas City Wizards selected him in the second round (fourteenth overall) of the 1999 MLS Supplemental Draft.  The Wizard released him during the preseason and Turner signed with the Charleston Battery of the USL A-League.  The Battery released him during the season and he finished the year with the Myrtle Beach Seadawgs.  Turner retired at the end of the season and joined Morgan Stanley Smith Barney.

External links
 Charleston Battery: Ryan Turner

References

Living people
1976 births
American soccer players
Charleston Battery players
Myrtle Beach Seadawgs players
Notre Dame Fighting Irish men's soccer players
A-League (1995–2004) players
USL Second Division players
Soccer players from Arizona
Sporting Kansas City draft picks
Association football midfielders